The Nissan Gymnastics Stadium is a stadium located in Guadalajara, Mexico.  It opened in February 2008 and hosted the gymnastics competition at the 2011 Pan American Games.   It has a capacity of 3,434.

See also
 Gymnastics at the 2011 Pan American Games

References

External links
 Profile

2008 establishments in Mexico
Sports venues completed in 2008
Sports venues in Guadalajara, Jalisco
Venues of the 2011 Pan American Games